The horned adder (Bitis caudalis) is a viper species. It is found in the arid region of southwest Africa, in Angola, Botswana, Namibia; South Africa, and Zimbabwe. It is easily distinguished by the presence of a single, large horn-like scale over each eye. No subspecies are currently recognized. Like all other vipers, it is venomous.

Common names
The species is commonly known as the horned adder, horned puff adder, or horned viper.

Description
A short, stout little viper, it usually averages  in total length (body + tail). The largest specimen reported being seen is a female from southern Botswana measuring  total length.

Geographic range
The snake is found in far arid regions of southwest Africa: southwest Angola, Namibia, across the Kalahari Desert of southern Botswana, into northern Transvaal and southwestern Zimbabwe. In South Africa, it is found from the northern Cape Province south to the Great Karoo.

Its type locality is given as "... the sandy districts north of the Cape Colony..." [South Africa].

Habitat
Horned adders are mostly found in sparsely vegetated desert and semiarid scrub country.

Venom
Bites are assumed to be rare and no epidemiological data are available.
Little information is available regarding the toxicity and amount of venom produced. Spawls and Branch (1995) reported an average yield of 85 mg of wet venom, while Christensen (1971) offered an  value of 1.2 mg/kg IV.
Other research has found the LD50 to be between 0.15 and 0.22 mg/kg 

Based on this LD50 value, Spawls and Branch (1995) estimated about 300 mg of this venom would be required to kill an adult. They regarded this venom as one of the weakest of the genus, although the tests are conducted solely on mice, which might have a different reaction from humans to the venom. On the other hand, an older report by the U.S. Navy (1965, 1991) suggested it is highly toxic and a number of deaths have occurred as a result. According to Broadley and Cock (1975), envenomation symptoms in humans include swelling, severe pain, nausea, vomiting and shock. Blisters and necrotic ulcers may form around the bite site.

The National Antivenom and Vaccine Production Centre in Riyadh, Saudi Arabia, produces a polyvalent antivenin that includes a paraspecific antibody that protects against bites from this species. According to the U.S. Navy (1965, 1991), polyvalent antivenins produced by SAIMR and the Pasteur Institute are said to be effective, while Mallow et al. (2003) reported currently available antivenins are of limited effectiveness.

Viljoen et al. (1982) isolated a protein, a neurotoxic phospholipase A2, from the venom, which they called "caudoxin". According to Lee et al. (1983), this is a presynaptic toxin similar to bungarotoxin, but with different binding sites.

Taxonomy
A number of authors, including Mertens (1955), use a trinomial to refer to this species, even though no subspecies are recognized.

References

Further reading

Branch, Bill. 2004. Field Guide to Snakes and Other Reptiles of Southern Africa. Sanibel Island, Florida: Ralph Curtis Books. 399 pp. . (Bitis caudalis, p. 116 + Plate 13.) 
Broadley DG, Cock EV. 1975. Snakes of Rhodesia. Zimbabwe: Longman Zimbabwe Ltd. 126 pp. ASIN B0006CM8SE.
Christensen PA. 1971. The venoms of Central and South Africa. In Bücherl W, Deulofeu V, Buckley EE. Venomous Animals and Their Venoms, Vol. I. New York: Academic Press. pp. 437–462. .
Smith A. 1839. Illustrations of the Zoology of South Africa; Consisting Chiefly of Figures and Descriptions of the Objects of Natural History Collected during an Expedition into the Interior of South Africa, in the Years 1834, 1835, and 1836; Fitted out by "The Cape of Good Hope Association for Exploring Central Africa:" together with a Summary of African Zoology, and an Inquiry into the Geographical Ranges of Species in that Quarter of the Globe. [Volume 3.] London: Lords Commissioners of Her Majesty's Treasury. (Smith, Elder and Co., printers.) 48 Plates + unnumbered pages of text. (Vipera caudalis, Plate 7.)
Viljoen CC, Botes DP, Kruger H. 1982. Isolation and characterization of the amino acid sequence of caudoxin, a presynaptic acting toxic phospholipase A2 from the venom of the horned puff adder (Bitis caudalis). Toxicon 20 (4): 715–737.

External links

 . Accessed 1 March 2007.
 . Accessed 1 March 2007.

Bitis
Snakes of Africa
Reptiles of Angola
Reptiles of Botswana
Reptiles of Namibia
Reptiles of South Africa
Reptiles of Zimbabwe
Reptiles described in 1839
Taxa named by Andrew Smith (zoologist)